Zu ol Bin (also Romanized as Z̄ū ol Bīn; also known as Dowlbeyn, Zolbeyn, and Zūlbīn) is a village in Qaranqu Rural District of the Central District of Hashtrud County, East Azerbaijan province, Iran. At the 2006 National Census, its population was 1,099 in 241 households. The following census in 2011 counted 1,175 people in 323 households. The latest census in 2016 showed a population of 1,309 people in 416 households; it was the largest village in its rural district.

References 

Hashtrud County

Populated places in East Azerbaijan Province

Populated places in Hashtrud County